State of India may refer to:

 Portuguese India, formally known as the State of India
 One of the states and union territories of India

See also
 Administrative divisions of India
 Indiana, a U.S. state